The 2014–2015 season was the 19th edition of the Lebanese Basketball League. The regular season began on Friday, December 5, 2014 and ended on Sunday March 1, 2015. The playoffs began on Tuesday, March 3 and ended with the 2015 Finals on Friday May 22, 2015, after Riyadi Beirut defeated UBA (Union Byblos Amchit) in 5 games to win their tenth title (new format).

Regular season

Standings

Playoffs

Brackets

Statistics leaders

Awards 
 Finals MVP: Fadi EL Khatib, Riyadi Beirut
 Player of the year: Nikoloz Tskitishvili, Champville SC
 Guard of the Year: Jasmon Youngblood, UBA
 Forward of the Year: Fadi El Khatib, Riyadi Beirut
 Center of the Year: Nikoloz Tskitishvili, Champville SC
 Newcomer of the Year: Ali Mezher, Hoops Club
 Import of the Year: Nikoloz Tskitishvili, Champville SC
 Domestic Player of the Year: Fadi El Khatib, Riyadi Beirut
 Defensive Player of the Year: Jean AbdelNour, Riyadi Beirut
 Coach of the Year: Ghassan Sarkis, Champville SC
 First Team:
 PG: Perry Petty, Mouttahed Tripoli
 SG: Jasmon Youngblood, UBA
 F/G: Fadi El Khatib, Riyadi Beirut
 F/C: Ismail Ahmad, Riyadi Beirut
 C/F: Nikoloz Tskitishvili, Champville SC
 Second Team:
 PG: Mohammed Ibrahim, UBA
 G: Dewarick Spencer, Mouttahed Tripoli
 F: Jeremiah Massey, Riyadi Beirut
 F: Bassel Bawji, Champville SC 
 F/C: Eli Holman, Riyadi Beirut

References

Lebanese Basketball League seasons
League
Lebanese